David Leslie McKenna (born 19 September 1986) is a Scottish footballer, who plays for Renfrew FC as a striker. He has also played for St Mirren, Cowdenbeath, Stirling Albion, Brechin City, Stranraer, East Stirlingshire and Annan Athletic.

Career
Born in Paisley, McKenna started his career at St Mirren. On 7 January 2006 he joined Cowdenbeath on loan, scoring 11 goals in a half season spell which saw him play a large role in the Blue Brazil winning their first league title in 67 years. Oddly enough he received another league championship medal that season from St Mirren who won the First Division. In June 2007, McKenna moved to Stirling Albion. During his time at Stirling he was part of the squad that won the 2009–10 Scottish Second Division.

After playing over 100 games for Stirling, he then moved to Brechin City at the end of the 2009–10 season. During three seasons at Brechin, he once again went on to play over 100 games for the club. In 2013, he was released by Brechin City and signed for Stranraer ahead of the 2013–14 season.

Mckenna joined East Stirlingshire in 2014 where he spent two seasons, before signing for Annan Athletic in June 2016. After one season with Annan, McKenna signed for Scottish Juniors club Beith Juniors.

On 12 January 2018, McKenna join Renfrew on a season loan until 11 February 2018.

Career statistics

A.  Other includes Scottish Football League play-offs & Scottish Challenge Cup.

Totals include:
St Mirren: 2 League appearances in  2003–04 where Soccerbase haven't recorded substitutions.
Stirling Albion: 1 Challenge Cup appearance in 2008–09, 1 Challenge Cup appearance & 1 Scottish Cup appearance in 2009–10 where Soccerbase haven't recorded line-ups.
Brechin City: 1 League Cup game in 2010–11 & 2 Scottish Cup games in 2010–11, 1 in 2011–12 & 1 in 2012–13 where Soccerbase haven't recorded line-ups.
Stranraer: 1 Challenge Cup game in 2013–14 where Soccerbase haven't included line-ups.

References

External links

 2 games for Cowdenbeath where appearances were given to the wrong player.

1986 births
Living people
Footballers from Paisley, Renfrewshire
Scottish footballers
Scottish Football League players
Scottish Premier League players
Association football forwards
St Mirren F.C. players
Cowdenbeath F.C. players
Stirling Albion F.C. players
Brechin City F.C. players
Stranraer F.C. players
East Stirlingshire F.C. players
Annan Athletic F.C. players
Beith Juniors F.C. players
Scottish Professional Football League players
Renfrew F.C. players
Scotland junior international footballers
Scottish Junior Football Association players